Massa Fermana is a comune (municipality) in the Province of Fermo in the Italian region Marche, located about  south of Ancona and about  northwest of Ascoli Piceno.

The parish church of Santi Lorenzo, Silvestro, e Ruffino houses the Massa Fermana Altarpiece (1468) by Carlo Crivelli. The St Anthony Gate dates to the 14th century.

In 1946, Ada Natali become mayor of this town, being the first female mayor in Italy's history.

References

Cities and towns in the Marche